Edakkudi is a village in the Papanasam taluk of Thanjavur district, Tamil Nadu, India.

Demographics 

As per the 2001 census, Edakkudi had a total population of 862 with 437 males and 425 females. The sex ratio was 973. The literacy rate was 62.33.

References 

 

Edakkudi is a village about 3 km from the nearest Station, Manganallur, which is on the Mayiladuthurai - Thiruvarur railway line.  Manganallur itself is just 8 km from Mayiladuthurai (erstwhile Mayavaram) in Tanjore District (now part of the Nagapattinam Quaid-e-Milat).

Villages in Thanjavur district